Hüsrev is a Turkish given name derived from the Persian name "Khusraw", having the same meaning.

People
 Gazi Hüsrev Pasha (died 1632), Ottoman Grand Vizier
 Koca Hüsrev Mehmed Pasha (died 1855), Ottoman Grand Admiral
 Hüsrev Gerede (1884–1962), Ottoman and Turkish officer and diplomat
 Münir Hüsrev Göle (1890–1955), Turkish politician

Structures
 Gazi Husrev-beg Mosque, a mosque in Bosnia and Herzegovina
 Gazi Husrev-beg Library, a library in Bosnia and Herzegovina

Turkish masculine given names